This is a list of girls' schools in India.

Assam
 Holy Child School Guwahati
 Tarini Choudhury Govt. Girls H.S. & M.P. School (Guhawati)

Bihar
St.Josephs Convent High School, Patna
 Mount Carmel School (Bhagalpur)
 Notre Dame Academy, Patna

Delhi
 Convent of Jesus and Mary, Delhi
 Holy Child Auxilium School
 Lady Irwin School
 Loreto Convent School, Delhi
 Mater Dei School, New Delhi
 Queen Mary's School Rohini

Goa
 St. Mary's Convent High School, Goa

Gujarat
 Arya Kanya Gurukul
 T. N. Rao School for girls, Rajkot
 Rajkumar College, Rajkot
 RB Ranchhodlal Chhotalal Girls High School

Haryana
 Convent of Jesus and Mary, Ambala
 Government Girls School, Kanwari
 Vidya Devi Jindal School

Jammu and Kashmir
 Presentation Convent Higher Secondary School
 Woodlands House School (separate girls' wing)

Jharkhand
 Bishop Westcott Girls' School (Ranchi)
 Sacred Heart Convent School (Jamshedpur)

Karnataka
 Baldwin Girls' High School (Bangalore)
 Bishop Cotton Girls' School (Bangalore)
 Goodwill's Girls' School, Bangalore
 Malleswaram Ladies' Association
 Sophia High School (middle and high school are girls only)

Kerala
 Baker Memorial Girls High School
 Government Higher Secondary School for Girls Cottonhill
 Holy Angel's Convent Trivandrum (girls only after IV)
 Holy Angels' I.S.C School, Thiruvananthapuram
 Mount Carmel Convent Anglo-Indian Girls High School
 Nirmala Bhavan Higher Secondary School
 Sacred Heart Girls' High School, Thalassery
 St. Mary's Convent Girls High School, Ollur
 St. Mary's Girls High School, Kozhencherry
 St. Philomena's Girls High School, Poonthura
 St. Raphael's Convent Girls High School, Ollur
 St. Teresa's Convent Girls' Higher Secondary School
 Mount Carmel Girls Higher Secondary School, Kanjikuzhy
 Fathima Matha Girls Higher Secondary School, Koompanpara
 St.Annes Girls Higher Secondary School, Kottayam

Madhya Pradesh
 Barli Development Institute for Rural Women
 St Joseph's Convent School, Bhopal
 Scindia Kanya Vidyalaya
 St. Raphael's Girls' Higher Secondary School

Maharashtra
 Fort Convent School, Mumbai
 Girton High School
 Holy Cross Convent High School, Thane
 J.B. Petit High School for Girls
 Kimmins High School
 Mary Immaculate Girls' High School
 Mount Carmel Convent School (Pune)
 Pravara Kanya Vidya Mandir
 Queen Mary School, Mumbai
 St. Anne's School (Pune)
 St Joseph's Convent High School, Mumbai
 St. Joseph's Convent School, Panchgani
 St. Mary's Convent High School, Mulund
 Walsingham House School

Manipur
 Little Flower School, Imphal

Meghalaya
 Christian Girls' Higher Secondary School, Tura

Odisha
 Carmel School, Rourkela
 Dabugaon Girls High School
 Govt. Girls' High School, Rayagada
 St Joseph's Convent School, Rourkela
 Sushilavati Government Women’s Junior College, Rourkela

Rajasthan
 Birla Balika Vidyapeeth
 Heritage Girls School
 Maharani Gayatri Devi Girls' Public School (Jaipur)
 Maharani Gayatri Devi Girls' School
 Mayo College Girls School
 Rajmata Krishna Kumari Girls' Public School
 Shri Vedic Kanya Senior Secondary School, Abu Road

Tamil Nadu
 Holy Angels Anglo Indian Higher Secondary School
 St. Francis Anglo-Indian Girls School
 St. Ignatius' Convent Higher Secondary School
 St. Joseph's Anglo-Indian Higher Secondary School
 St. Joseph's Convent Higher Secondary School
 St. Joseph's School, Trichy
 St Joseph's Matriculation Higher Secondary School, Madurai, Tamil Nadu
 St. Kevin's Anglo Indian High School
 St Ebba's School
 St. John's Girls Higher Secondary School
 St. Theresa's Girls' Higher Secondary School
 Victoria Girls Higher Secondary School

Telangana
 Rosary Convent High School
 St. Ann's High School, Secunderabad
 Stanley Girls High School
 Wesley Girls High School, Secunderabad

Uttar Pradesh
 Akbarpur Girls Inter College
 C.D. Girls Inter College
 Central Hindu Girls School (Bhelpur, Varanasi)
 Girls' High School and College, Allahabad
 Government Girls Inter College, Dildar Nagar
 La Martiniere Lucknow Girls' Campus
 Loreto Convent Lucknow
 Pardada Pardadi School
 St. Agnes' Loreto Day School
 St. Mary's Convent Inter College, Prayagraj

Uttarakhand
 Ashok Hall Girls' Residential School
 Convent of Jesus and Mary, Waverley, Mussoorie
 Ecole Globale International Girls' School (Dehadrun)
 Mussoorie International School
 St. Mary's Convent High School, Nainital
 Unison World School
 Welham Girls' School (Dehadrun)

West Bengal
 Kolkata (Calcutta)
 Ashok Hall Girls' Higher Secondary School
 Bankim Ghosh Memorial Girls' High School
 Barisha Girls' High School
 Behala Girls' High School
 Beltala Girls' High School
 Bidya Bharati Girls' High School
 Binodini Girls' High School
 Brahmo Balika Shikshalaya
 The Calcutta Anglo Gujarati School (separate girls' school)
 Calcutta Girls' High School
 Carmel School, Kolkata
 Dum Dum Motijheel Girls' High School
 Garfa Dhirendranath Memorial Girls' High School
 Holy Child Girls' High School
 Jadavpur Sammilita Girls' High School
 Jodhpur Park Girls’ High School
 Kalikrishna Girls' High School
 Kamala Girls' High School
 Kamala Chatterjee School
 La Martiniere Calcutta Girls' Campus
 Loreto House
 Loreto Schools, Kolkata
 Maheshwari Girls' School
 Nivedita Vidyapith
 Our Lady Queen of the Missions School
 Ramakrishna Sarada Mission Sister Nivedita Girls' School
 St. John's Diocesan Girls' Higher Secondary School
 Sakhawat Memorial Govt. Girls' High School
 Shri Shikshayatan School
 Sree Sarada Ashram Balika Vidyalaya
 Elsewhere in West Bengal
 Adhyapak Jyotish Chandra Ghosh Balika Vidyalaya (Chinsurah)
 Aligunj Rishi Raj Narayan Balika Vidyalaya (Midnapore)
 Amtala Annadamani Balika Vidyalaya (Murshidabad)
 Arambagh Girls' High School (Arambag)
 Barlow Girls' High School (Malda)
 Begri Girls High School (Domjur)
 Brajabala Girls' High School (Ranaghat)
 Burdwan Municipal Girls' High School (Burdwan)
 Carmel Convent High School, Durgapur (Durgapur)
 Contai Chandramani Brahmo Girls' School (Contai)
 Contai Hindu Girls' School (Contai)
 Deulpota Bhagbat Balika Vidyalaya (Contai)
 Gangarampur Girls' High School (Gangarampur)
 Holy Child Institute Girls' Higher Secondary School
 Howrah Sangha Adarsha Balika Vidyalaya (Howrah)
 Jaynagar Institution for Girls (Jaynagar)
 Kalikrishna Girls' High School (Barasat)
 Kalimpong Girls' High School (Kalimpong)
 Kola Union Jogendra Girls High School (Kolaghat)
 Loreto Convent, Asansol (Asansol)
 Loreto Convent, Darjeeling (Darjeeling)
 Maharani Girls' High School, Darjeeling (Darjeeling)
 Majilpur Shyamsundar Balika Vidyalaya (Jaynagar)
 Midnapore Collegiate Girls' High School (Midnapore)
 Mission Girls' High School (Midnapore)
 Nandapur Milani Balika Vidyaniketan (Chandipur)
 Rajkumari Santanamoyee Girls' High School (Tamluk)
 Ram Chandra Saha Balika Vidyalaya (Gazole)
 Ramesh Chandra Girl's High School, Serampore (Serampore)
 Rampurhat Girls' High School (Rampurhat)
 Serampore Girl's High School (Akna Girl's High School) (Serampore)
 Shyam Sukhi Balika Siksha Niketan (Gazole)
 Sibpur Hindu Girls High School (Shibpur)
 St Joseph's Convent, Chandannagar (Chandannagar)
 Suniti Academy (Cooch Behar)
 Vidyasagar Vidyapith Girls' High School (Midnapore)

Former schools
 Hindu Mahila Vidyalaya

References

India
Girls